Poon Fook Loke (born 30 May 1951) is a Malaysian field hockey player. He competed at the 1976 Summer Olympics and the 1984 Summer Olympics.
Poon was part of the legendary Malaysian team that finished fourth in the 1975 World Cup, a feat that remains unparalleled to this day.

References

External links

1951 births
Living people
Malaysian sportspeople of Chinese descent
Malaysian male field hockey players
Olympic field hockey players of Malaysia
Field hockey players at the 1976 Summer Olympics
Field hockey players at the 1984 Summer Olympics
Place of birth missing (living people)
Asian Games medalists in field hockey
Asian Games bronze medalists for Malaysia
Medalists at the 1974 Asian Games
Field hockey players at the 1974 Asian Games